Badminton was contested at the 2015 Summer Universiade from July 6 to 12 at the  Hwasun Hanium Culture Sports Center in Hwasun, South Korea. Men's and women's singles, men's, women's, and mixed doubles, and mixed team events will be contested.

Medal summary

Medal table
South Korea became the overall champion after winning all the events competed, with 6 gold, 2 silver and 1 bronze medals.

Medal events
South Korea clinched the individual and the team event. In the mixed team event, they won the title with a comprehensive 3–0 beating China. After the Chinese player, Yu Xiaohan was  tested positive for doping violation, her women's doubles silver medal was reallocated, and China was disqualified and the team placings were also reallocated. The table below gives an overview of the individual and team event medal winners at the 2015 Summer Universiade.

Match Result

Mixed Team

Participating nations

 Chinese Taipei

References

External links
2015 Summer Universiade – Badminton

2015
Universiade
2015 Summer Universiade events
Badminton tournaments in South Korea